Rasinampatti is a small village in Madurai district of Tamil Nadu, India.

Villages in Madurai district